Ainsworth Bay in the Tierra del Fuego region of Chile is a coastal inlet fed by the meltwater of Marinelli Glacier. The Marinelli Glacier is in a state of retreat.

See also
 Southern elephant seal

References
C. Michael Hogan. 2008 Bahia Wulaia Dome Middens, Megalithic Portal, ed. Andy Burnham
 Eric Earle Shipton (2007) Tierra del Fuego: The Fatal Lodestone, Published by Readers Union, 175 pages

Line notes

Bays of Chile
Bodies of water of Magallanes Region
Isla Grande de Tierra del Fuego